Zero Assoluto  is an Italian pop rock duo comprising Thomas De Gasperi (born in Rome on 24 June 1977) and Matteo Maffucci (born in Rome on 28 May 1978). They met each other when they were teenagers and became best friends.

History
Their first single, Ultimo capodanno was released in 1999.  Scendi, containing Mezz'ora and Minimalismi, followed in 2004.

During the summer of 2005 they entered the Italian Top 40 chart with "Semplicemente", which reached the number two. The success of this song allowed them to participate at the 56th Sanremo Music Festival where the group performed "Svegliarsi la mattina" in the "Band" category – the single eventually reached the top spot on the Italian Top 40 chart. Additional hit success followed with the song "Sei parte di me", which also reached number 1.

Matteo Maffucci also works as a DJ for the national radio network RTL 102.5.  Together with bandmate De Gasperi he hosts Suite 102.5 and has hosted RTL 102.5 Television 3° piano-internoB.

Also to Maffucci's credit are the books Ore a Caso and Ultimo Stadio and his third book, "Spielberg ti odio" on the market from January 10, 2007. As well as collaborations with the
magazines Tutto, Rockstar and GQ.

2006–2009
In 2006 Zero Assoluto was featured on a version of the Nelly Furtado song "All Good Things (Come to an End)" released on the Italian version of the album Loose.

The band again entered the Sanremo Festival in 2007, where they placed ninth with "Appena prima di partire". Nelly Furtado performed at the event as a guest star. Their second album "Appena prima di partire" was released during the festival and reached platinum status on 15 April.

On 7 May the international version of "Appena prima di partire", featuring Nelly Furtado, was released in all Italian radio stations. Their last single, "Meglio così", was released on 25 May.

During the summer of 2007 they performed their "Zero Assoluto Live" with more than forty concerts all around Italy.

From 15 October 2007 Zero Assoluto have presented "Vale tutto", the first quiz-show on MTV Italia.

On 16 October they released their DVD "Zero Assoluto Extra", including all their videoclips (excepting "Come voglio" and "Ultimo capodanno"), backstage, films not used in the videoclips, lives from their tours, interviews, pictures and the "Appena prima di partire" video featuring Nelly Furtado.

Three songs from "Appena prima di partire", including "Quello che mi davi tu", have been put in the soundtrack of "Scusa ma ti chiamo amore", from the homonymous book by Federico Moccia. In the film there is a scene made during their 2007 live tour.

In May 2009, Zero Assoluto performed their song "Per dimenticare" with the new album Sotto Una Pioggia Di Parole that has been released in June 2009. The singles of this album was performed for the Silvio Mucciono's fil Scusa ma ti voglio sposare in 2010.

2010-present
In summer 2010 Zeroassoluto released the single Grazie. On 31 May 2011 Zero Assoluto released their fourth album, titled Perdermi, in which the Roman duo offers a sound-genre of music that embraces the pop rap. The first single from their fourth album was Questa Estate Strana, released on 22 April; the next single was released on 15 July 2011.

Discography

Studio albums
2004: Scendi
2007: Appena Prima Di Partire
2009: Sotto Una Pioggia Di Parole
2011: Perdermi
2014: Alla fine del giorno
2016: Di me e di te

See also
 Absolute zero (the English translation of "Zero assoluto")

External links
 Official site (Italian)

Italian musical groups
Italian-language singers